The 1996 Orlando Predators season was the sixth season for the Orlando Predators. They finished the 1996 Arena Football League season 9–5 and finished the season with a loss in the quarterfinals of the playoffs to the Arizona Rattlers.

Schedule

Regular season

Playoffs
The Predators were awarded the No. 6 seed in the AFL playoffs.

Standings

Awards

References

Orlando Predators seasons
1996 Arena Football League season
Orlando Predators Season, 1996